Johan Fredrik Göstasson (Gson) Bergenstråhle (23 September 1926 – 10 February 2005) was a Swedish diplomat.

Biography
Bergenstråhle was born in Stockholm, Sweden, the son of Colonel Gösta Bergenstråhle and his wife Greta (née Löfgren). He received a Candidate of Law degree in Stockholm in 1950 and served at Swedish National Bank and the General Export Association of Sweden from 1956 to 1961 before becoming an attaché at the Ministry for Foreign Affairs in 1952. Bergenstråhle served in Bonn from 1954 to 1956 and was Embassy Secretary in Rio de Janeiro from 1956 to 1961. He was Senior Administrative Officer at the Foreign Ministry from 1961 to 1965, Embassy Counsellor in Brussels from 1965 to 1971 and Embassy Counsellor and acting Chargé d'affaires in Kuala Lumpur from 1971 to 1975. During his time as Chargé d'affaires in Kuala Lumpur in 1975, Bergenstråhle was held hostage for over 80 hours by the Japanese Red Army, but was released unharmed.

He was Ambassador in Baghdad from 1975 to 1979, Consul-general in San Francisco from 1979 and 1980 and Ambassador in Jeddah, Muscat and Sana'a from 1980 to 1984. Bergenstråhle was a negotiator at the Foreign Ministry in 1985 and then took leave from the Foreign Ministry to serve at Astra Pharmaceuticals International in England from 1986 to 1988. He was then Ambassador in Bogotá from 1989 to 1991.

Personal life
In 1956 he married Wilhelmina (Willy) de Weerd (born 1927), the daughter of director Gerrit Jan de Weerd and Jeanette Aleida (née Kloosterboer).

See also
1975 AIA building hostage crisis

References

1926 births
2005 deaths
Consuls-general of Sweden
Ambassadors of Sweden to Iraq
Ambassadors of Sweden to Saudi Arabia
Ambassadors of Sweden to Oman
Ambassadors of Sweden to Yemen
Ambassadors of Sweden to Colombia
People from Stockholm
Swedish people taken hostage
Foreign hostages in Malaysia